"I Lie" is a song written by Tom Damphier, and recorded by American Country Music artist Loretta Lynn.  It was released in 1982 as the first single and title track from the album I Lie.  The song reached number 9 on the Billboard Hot Country Singles & Tracks chart. It was Lynn's last Billboard top ten single of her career.

Charts

Weekly charts

Year-end charts

References

1982 singles
Loretta Lynn songs
Song recordings produced by Owen Bradley
MCA Records singles
1982 songs